The Biological Weapons Convention (BWC), or Biological and Toxin Weapons Convention (BTWC), is a disarmament treaty that effectively bans biological and toxin weapons by prohibiting their development, production, acquisition, transfer, stockpiling and use. The treaty's full name is the Convention on the Prohibition of the Development, Production and Stockpiling of Bacteriological (Biological) and Toxin Weapons and on their Destruction.

Having entered into force on 26 March 1975, the BWC was the first multilateral disarmament treaty to ban the production of an entire category of weapons of mass destruction. The convention is of unlimited duration. As of February 2023, 185 states have become party to the treaty. Four additional states have signed but not ratified the treaty, and another eight states have neither signed nor acceded to the treaty.

The BWC is considered to have established a strong global norm against biological weapons. This norm is reflected in the treaty's preamble, which states that the use of biological weapons would be "repugnant to the conscience of mankind". It is also demonstrated by the fact that not a single state today declares to possess or seek biological weapons, or asserts that their use in war is legitimate. In light of the rapid advances in biotechnology, biodefense expert Daniel Gerstein has described the BWC as "the most important arms control treaty of the twenty-first century". However, the convention's effectiveness has been limited due to insufficient institutional support and the absence of any formal verification regime to monitor compliance.

History 
While the history of biological warfare goes back more than six centuries to the siege of Caffa in 1346, international restrictions on biological warfare began only with the 1925 Geneva Protocol, which prohibits the use but not the possession or development of chemical and biological weapons. Upon ratification of the Geneva Protocol, several countries made reservations regarding its applicability and use in retaliation. Due to these reservations, it was in practice a "no-first-use" agreement only. In particular, it did not prevent multiple states from starting and scaling offensive biological weapons programs, including the United States (active from 1943 to 1969) and the Soviet Union (active from the 1920s until at least 1992).

The American biowarfare system was terminated in 1969 by President Nixon when he issued his Statement on Chemical and Biological Defense Policies and Programs. The statement ended, unconditionally, all U.S. offensive biological weapons programs. When Nixon ended the program the budget was $300 million annually.

The BWC sought to supplement the Geneva Protocol and was negotiated in the Conference of the Committee on Disarmament in Geneva from 1969 to 1972, following the conclusion of the negotiation of the Treaty on the Non-Proliferation of Nuclear Weapons. Of significance was a 1968 British proposal to separate consideration of chemical and biological weapons and to first negotiate a convention on biological weapons. The negotiations gained further momentum when the United States decided to unilaterally end its offensive biological weapons program in 1969 and support the British proposal. In March 1971, the Soviet Union and its allies reversed their earlier opposition to the separation of chemical and biological weapons and tabled their own draft convention. The final negotiation stage was reached when the United States and the Soviet Union submitted identical but separate drafts of the BWC text on 5 August 1971. The BWC was opened for signature on 10 April 1972 with ceremonies in London, Moscow, and Washington, D.C., and it entered into force on 26 March 1975 after the ratification by 22 states, including its three depositary governments (the Soviet Union, the United Kingdom, and the United States).

There have been some concerned scientists who have called for the modernization of the BWC at the periodic Review Conferences. For example, Filippa Lentzos and Gregory Koblentz pointed out in 2016 that "crucial contemporary debates about new developments" for the BWC Review Conferences included "gain-of-function experiments, potential pandemic pathogens, CRISPR and other genome editing technologies, gene drives, and synthetic biology".

Treaty obligations 

With only 15 articles, the BWC is relatively short. Over time, the treaty has been interpreted and supplemented by additional politically binding agreements and understandings reached by its States Parties at eight subsequent Review Conferences.

Summary of key articles 

 Article I: Never under any circumstances to develop, produce, stockpile, acquire, or retain biological weapons.
 Article II: To destroy or divert to peaceful purposes biological weapons and associated resources prior to joining.
 Article III: Not to transfer, or in any way assist, encourage, or induce anyone else to acquire or retain biological weapons.
 Article IV: To take any national measures necessary to implement the provisions of the BWC domestically.
 Article V: Undertaking to consult bilaterally and multilaterally and cooperate in solving any problems which may arise in relation to the objective, or in the application, of the BWC.
 Article VI: Right to request the United Nations Security Council to investigate alleged breaches of the BWC and undertaking to cooperate in carrying out any investigation initiated by the Security Council.
 Article VII: To assist States which have been exposed to danger as a result of a violation of the BWC.
 Article X: Undertaking to facilitate, and have the right to participate in, the fullest possible exchange of equipment, materials and information for peaceful purposes.
The remaining articles concern the BWC's compatibility with the 1925 Geneva Protocol (Article VIII), negotiations to prohibit chemical weapons (Article IX), amendments (Article XI), Review Conferences (Article XII), duration (Article XIII, 1), withdrawal (Article XIII, 2), joining the convention, depositary governments, and conditions for entry into force (Article XIV, 1–5), and languages (Article XV).

Article I: Prohibition of biological weapons 
Article I is the core of the BWC and requires each state "never in any circumstances to develop, produce, stockpile or otherwise acquire or retain:

 microbial or other biological agents, or toxins whatever their origin or method of production, of types and in quantities that have no justification for prophylactic, protective or other peaceful purposes; 
 weapons, equipment or means of delivery designed to use such agents or toxins for hostile purposes or in armed conflict."

Article I does not prohibit any specific biological agents or toxins as such but rather certain purposes for which they may be employed. This prohibition is known as the general-purpose criterion and is also used in Article II, 1 of the 1993 Chemical Weapons Convention (CWC). The general-purpose criterion covers all hostile uses of biological agents, including those developed in the future, and recognizes that biological agents and toxins are inherently dual use. While these agents may be employed for nefarious ends, they also have several legitimate peaceful purposes, including developing medicines and vaccines to counter natural or deliberate disease outbreaks. Against this background, Article I only considers illegitimate those types and quantities of biological agents or toxins and their means of delivery which cannot be justified by prophylactic, protective, or other peaceful purposes; regardless of whether the agents in question affect humans, animals, or plants. A disadvantage of this intent-based approach is a blurring of the line between defensive and offensive biological weapons research.

While it was initially unclear during the early negotiations of the BWC whether viruses would be regulated by it since they lie "at the edge of life"—they possess some but not all of the characteristics of life—viruses were defined as biological agents in 1969 and thus fall within the BWC's scope.

While Article I does not explicitly prohibit the "use" of biological weapons as it was already considered to be prohibited by the 1925 Geneva Protocol, it is still regarded as a violation of the BWC, as reaffirmed by the final document of the Fourth Review Conference in 1996.

Article III: Prohibition of transfer and assistance 
Article III bans the transfer, encouragement, assistance, or inducement of anyone, whether governments or non-state actors, in developing or acquiring any of the agents, toxins, weapons, equipment, or means of delivery specified in Article I. The article's objective is to prevent the proliferation of biological weapons by limiting the availability of materials and technology which may be used for hostile purposes.

Article IV: National implementation 
Article IV obliges BWC States Parties to implement the convention's provisions domestically. This is essential to allow national authorities to investigate, prosecute, and punish any activities prohibited by the BWC; to prevent access to biological agents for harmful purposes; and to detect and respond to the potential use of biological weapons. National implementing measures may take various forms, such as legislation, regulations, codes of conduct, and others. Which implementing measures are adequate for a state depends on several factors, including its legal system, its size and geography, the development of its biotechnology industry, and its participation in regional economic cooperation. Since no one set of measures fits all states, the implementation of specific obligations is left to States Parties' discretion, based on their assessment of what will best enable them to ensure compliance with the BWC.

A database of over 1,500 laws and regulations that States Parties have enacted to implement the BWC domestically is maintained by the non-governmental organization VERTIC. These concern the penal code, enforcement measures, import and export controls, biosafety and biosecurity measures, as well as domestic and international cooperation and assistance. For instance, the 1989 Biological Weapons Anti-Terrorism Act implemented the Convention for the United States. A 2016 VERTIC report concluded that there remain "significant quantitative gaps" in the BWC's legislative and regulatory implementation since "many States have yet to adopt necessary measures to give effect to certain obligations". The BWC's Implementation Support Unit issued a background information document on "strengthening national implementation" in 2018 and an update in 2019.

Article V: Consultation and cooperation 
Article V requires States Parties to consult one another and cooperate in disputes concerning the purpose or implementation of the BWC. The Second Review Conference in 1986 agreed on procedures to ensure that alleged violations of the BWC would be promptly addressed at a consultative meeting when requested by a State Party. These procedures were further elaborated by the Third Review Conference in 1991. One formal consultative meeting has taken place, in 1997 at the request of Cuba.

Article VI: Complaint about an alleged BWC violation 
Article VI allows States Parties to lodge a complaint with the United Nations Security Council if they suspect a breach of treaty obligations by another state. Moreover, the article requires states to cooperate with any investigation which the Security Council may launch. As of January 2022, no state has ever used Article VI to file a formal complaint, despite several states having been accused in other fora of maintaining offensive biological weapons capabilities. The unwillingness to invoke Article VI may be explained by the highly political nature of the Security Council, where the five permanent members—China, France, Russia, the United Kingdom, and the United States—hold veto power, including over investigations for alleged treaty violations.

Article VII: Assistance after a BWC violation 
Article VII obliges States Parties to provide assistance to states that so request it if the UN Security Council decides they have been exposed to danger as a result of a violation of the BWC. In addition to helping victims in the event of a biological weapons attack, the purpose of the article is to deter such attacks from occurring in the first place by reducing their potential for harm through international solidarity and assistance. Despite no state ever having invoked Article VII, the article has drawn more attention in recent years, in part due to increasing evidence of terrorist organizations being interested in acquiring biological weapons and also following various naturally occurring epidemics. In 2018, the BWC's Implementation Support Unit issued a background document describing a number of additional understandings and agreements on Article VII that have been reached at past Review Conferences.

Article X: Peaceful cooperation 
Article X protects States Parties' right to exchange biological materials, technology, and information to be used for peaceful purposes. The article states that the implementation of the BWC shall avoid hampering the economic or technological development of States Parties or peaceful international cooperation on biological projects. The Seventh Review Conference in 2011 established an Article X database, which matches voluntary requests and offers for assistance and cooperation among States Parties and international organizations.

Membership and joining the BWC 

The BWC has 185 States Parties as of February 2023, with South Sudan the most recent to become a party. Four states have signed but not ratified the treaty: Egypt, Haiti, Somalia, and Syria. Nine additional states have neither signed nor acceded to the treaty: Chad, Comoros, Djibouti, Eritrea, Israel, Kiribati, Micronesia, South Sudan and Tuvalu. For two of these 13 states not party to the convention, the process of joining is well advanced, while an additional four states have started the process. The BWC's degree of universality remains low compared to other weapons of mass destruction regimes, including the Chemical Weapons Convention with 193 parties and the Treaty on the Non-Proliferation of Nuclear Weapons with 191 parties.

States can join the BWC through either ratification, accession or succession, in accordance with their national constitutional processes, which often require parliamentary approval. Ratification applies to states which had previously signed the treaty before it entered into force in 1975. Since then, signing the treaty is no longer possible, but states can accede to it. Succession concerns newly independent states that accept to be bound by a treaty that the predecessor state had joined. The Convention enters into force on the date when an instrument of ratification, accession, or succession is deposited with at least one of the depositary governments (the Russian Federation, the United Kingdom, and the United States).

Several countries made reservations when ratifying the BWC declaring that it did not imply their complete satisfaction that the treaty allows the stockpiling of biological agents and toxins for "prophylactic, protective or other peaceful purposes", nor should it imply recognition of other countries they do not recognize.

Verification and compliance

Confidence-building measures 

At the Second Review Conference in 1986, BWC States Parties agreed to strengthen the treaty by exchanging annual confidence-building measures (CBMs). These politically binding reports aim to prevent or reduce the occurrence of ambiguities, doubts and suspicions, and at improving international cooperation on peaceful biological activities. CBMs are the main formal mechanism through which States Parties regularly exchange compliance-related information. After revisions by the Third, Sixth, and Seventh Review Conferences, the current CBM form requires states to provide information annually on six issues (CBM D was deleted by the Seventh Review Conference in 2011):

 CBM A: (i) research centres and laboratories, and (ii) national biological defence research and development programs 
 CBM B: outbreaks of infectious diseases and similar occurrences caused by toxins 
 CBM C: efforts to promote research results
 CBM E: legislation, regulations, and other measures
 CBM F: past activities in offensive and/or defensive biological research and development programs 
 CBM G: vaccine production facilities

While the number of CBM submissions has increased over time, the overall participation rate remains low at less than 50 percent. In 2018, an online CBM platform was launched to facilitate the electronic submission of CBM reports. An increasing number of states are making their CBM reports publicly available on the platform, but many reports remain only accessible to other states. The history and implementation of the CBM system have been described by the BWC Implementation Support Unit in a 2016 report to the Eighth Review Conference.

Failed negotiation of a verification protocol 
Unlike the chemical or nuclear weapons regimes, the BWC lacks both a system to verify states' compliance with the treaty and a separate international organization to support the convention's effective implementation. Agreement on such a system was not feasible at the time the BWC was negotiated, largely due to Cold War politics but also due to a belief it was not necessary and that the BWC would be difficult to verify. U.S. biological weapons expert Jonathan B. Tucker commented that "this lack of an enforcement mechanism has undermined the effectiveness of the BWC, as it is unable to prevent systematic violations".

Earlier drafts of the BWC included limited provisions for addressing compliance issues, but these were removed during the negotiation process. Some countries attempted to reintroduce these provisions when the BWC text was submitted to the General Assembly in 1971 but were unsuccessful, as were attempts led by Sweden at the First Review Conference in 1980.

Following the end of the Cold War, a long negotiation process to add a verification mechanism began in 1991, when the Third Review Conference established an expert group on verification, VEREX, with the mandate to identify and examine potential verification measures from a scientific and technical standpoint. During four meetings in 1992 and 1993, VEREX considered 21 verification measures, including inspections of facilities, monitoring relevant publications, and other on-site and off-site measures. Another stimulus came from the successful negotiation of the Chemical Weapons Convention, which opened for signature in 1993.

Subsequently, a Special Conference of BWC States Parties in 1994 considered the VEREX report and decided to establish an Ad Hoc Group to negotiate a legally-binding verification protocol. The Ad Hoc Group convened 24 sessions between 1995 and 2001, during which it negotiated a draft protocol to the BWC which would establish an international organization and introduce a verification system. This organization would employ inspectors who would regularly visit declared biological facilities on-site and could also investigate specific suspect facilities and activities. Nonetheless, states found it difficult to agree on several fundamental issues, including export controls and the scope of on-site visits. By early 2001, the "rolling text" of the draft protocol still contained many areas on which views diverged widely.

In March 2001, a 210-page draft protocol was circulated by the chairman of the Ad Hoc Group, which attempted to resolve the contested issues. However, at the 24th session of the Ad Hoc Group in July 2001 the George W. Bush administration rejected both the draft protocol circulated by the Group's Chairman and the entire approach on which the draft was based, resulting in the collapse of the negotiation process. To justify its decision, the United States asserted that the protocol would not have improved BWC compliance and would have harmed U.S. national security and commercial interests. Many analysts, including Matthew Meselson and Amy Smithson, criticized the U.S. decision as undermining international efforts against non-proliferation and as contradicting U.S. government rhetoric regarding the alleged biological weapons threat posed by Iraq and other U.S. adversaries.

In subsequent years, calls for restarting negotiations on a verification protocol have been repeatedly voiced. For instance, during the 2019 Meeting of Experts "several States Parties stressed the urgency of resuming multilateral negotiations aimed at concluding a non-discriminatory, legally-binding instrument dealing with (...) verification measures". However, since "some States Parties did not support the negotiation of a protocol to the BWC" it seems "neither realistic nor practicable to return to negotiations". Notably, the Biden administration seems to reconsider the U.S. position on verification, as demonstrated by U.S. ambassador Bonnie Jenkins calling on the 2021 BWC Meeting of States Parties to "establish a new expert working group to examine possible measures to strengthen implementation of the Convention, increase transparency, and enhance assurance of compliance".

Non-compliance 
A number of BWC States Parties have been accused of breaching the convention's obligations by developing or producing biological weapons. Because of the intense secrecy around biological weapons programs, it is challenging to assess the actual scope of biological activities and whether they are legitimate defensive programs or a violation of the Convention—except for a few cases with an abundance of evidence for offensive development of biological weapons.

Soviet Union and Russia 

Despite being a party and depositary to the BWC, the Soviet Union has operated the world's largest, longest, and most sophisticated biological weapons program, which goes back to the 1920s under the Red Army. Around the time when the BWC negotiations were finalized, and the treaty was signed in the early 1970s, the Soviet Union significantly expanded its covert biological weapons program under the oversight of the "civilian" institution Biopreparat within the Soviet Ministry of Health. The Soviet program employed up to 65,000 people in several hundred facilities and successfully weaponized several pathogens, such as those responsible for smallpox, tularemia, bubonic plague, influenza, anthrax, glanders, and Marburg fever.

The Soviet Union first drew much suspicion of violating its obligations under the BWC after an unusual anthrax outbreak in 1979 in the Soviet city of Sverdlovsk (formerly, and now again, Yekaterinburg) resulted in the deaths of approximately 65 to 100 people. The Soviet authorities blamed the outbreak on the consumption of contaminated meat and for years denied any connection between the incident and biological weapons research. However, investigations concluded that the outbreak was caused by an accident at a nearby military microbiology facility, resulting in the escape of an aerosol of anthrax pathogen. Supporting this finding, Russian President Boris Yeltsin later admitted that "our military developments were the cause".

Western concerns about Soviet compliance with the BWC increased during the late 1980s and were supported by information provided by several defectors, including Vladimir Pasechnik and Ken Alibek. American President George H. W. Bush and British Prime Minister Margaret Thatcher therefore directly challenged President Gorbachev with the information. After the Soviet Union's dissolution, the United Kingdom, the United States, and Russia concluded the Trilateral Agreement on 14 September 1992, reaffirming their commitment to full compliance with the BWC and declaring that Russia had eliminated its inherited offensive biological weapons program. The agreement's objective was to uncover details about the Soviet's biological weapons program and to verify that all related activities had truly been terminated.

David Kelly, a British expert on biological warfare and participant in the visits arranged under the Trilateral Agreement, concluded that, on the one hand, the agreement "was a significant achievement" in that it "provided evidence of Soviet non-compliance from 1975 to 1991"; on the other hand, Kelly noted that the Trilateral Agreement "failed dramatically" because Russia did not "acknowledge and fully account for either the former Soviet programme or the biological weapons activities that it had inherited and continued to engage in".

Milton Leitenberg and Raymond Zilinskas, authors of the 2012 book The Soviet Biological Weapons Program: A History, assert that Russia may still continue parts of the Soviet biological weapons program today. Similarly, as of 2021, the U.S. Department of State "assesses that the Russian Federation (Russia) maintains an offensive [biological weapons] program and is in violation of its obligation under Articles I and II of the BWC. The issue of compliance by Russia with the BWC has been of concern for many years".

Iraq 

Starting around 1985 under Saddam Hussein's leadership, Iraq weaponized anthrax, botulinum toxin, aflatoxin, and other agents, and created delivery vehicles, including bombs, missile warheads, aerosol generators, and spray systems. Thereby, Iraq breached the provisions of the BWC, which it had signed in 1972, although it only ratified the Convention in 1991 as a condition of the cease-fire agreement that ended the 1991 Gulf War. The Iraqi biological weapons program—along with its chemical weapons program—was uncovered after the Gulf War through the investigations of the United Nations Special Commission (UNSCOM), which was responsible for disarmament in post-war Iraq. Iraq deliberately obstructed, delayed, and deceived the UNSCOM investigations and only admitted to having operated an offensive biological weapons program under significant pressure in 1995. While Iraq maintained that it ended its biological weapons program in 1991, many analysts believe that the country violated its BWC obligations by continuing the program until at least 1996.

Other accusations of non-compliance 
In April 1997, Cuba invoked the provisions of Article V to request a formal consultative meeting to consider its allegations that the United States introduced the crop-eating insect Thrips palmi to Cuba via crop-spraying planes in October 1996. Cuba and the United States presented evidence for their diverging views on the incident in a formal consultation in August 1997. Having reviewed the evidence, twelve States Parties submitted reports, of which nine concluded that the evidence did not support the Cuban allegations, and two (China and Vietnam) maintained it was inconclusive.

At the Fifth BWC Review Conference in 2001, the United States charged four BWC States Parties—Iran, Iraq, Libya, and North Korea—and one signatory, Syria, with operating covert biological weapons programs. Moreover, a 2019 report from the U.S. Department of State raises concerns regarding BWC compliance in China, Russia, North Korea, and Iran. The report concluded that North Korea "has an offensive biological weapons program and is in violation of its obligations under Articles I and II of the BWC" and that Iran "has not abandoned its (...) development of biological agents and toxins for offensive purposes".

In recent years, Russia has repeatedly alleged that the United States is supporting and operating biological weapons facilities in the Caucasus and Central Asia, in particular the Richard Lugar Center for Public Health Research in the Republic of Georgia. The U.S. Department of State called these allegations "groundless" and reaffirmed that "all U.S. activities (...) [were] consistent with the obligations set forth in the Biological Weapons Convention". Biological weapons expert Filippa Lentzos agreed that the Russian allegations are "unfounded" and commented that they are "part of a disinformation campaign". Similarly, Swedish biodefense specialists Roger Roffey and Anna-Karin Tunemalm called the allegations "a Russian propaganda tool".

Implementation Support Unit 

After a decade of negotiations, the major effort to institutionally strengthen the BWC failed in 2001, which would have resulted in a legally binding protocol to establish an Organization for the Prohibition of Biological Weapons (OPBW). Against this background, the Sixth Review Conference in 2006 created an Implementation Support Unit (ISU) funded by the States Parties to the BWC and housed in the Geneva Branch of the United Nations Office for Disarmament Affairs. The unit's mandate is to provide administrative support, assist the national implementation of the BWC, encourage the treaty's universal adoption, pair assistance requests and offers, and oversee the confidence-building measures process.

With a staff size of only three and a budget smaller than the average McDonald's restaurant, the ISU does not compare with the institutions established to deal with chemical or nuclear weapons. For example, the Organisation for the Prohibition of Chemical Weapons (OPCW) has about 500 employees, the International Atomic Energy Agency employs around 2,600 people, and the CTBTO Preparatory Commission employs around 280 staff.

Review Conferences 
States Parties have formally reviewed the operation of the BWC at periodic Review Conferences held every five years; the first took place in 1980. The objective of these conferences is to ensure the effective realization of the convention's goals and, in accordance with Article XII, to "take into account any new scientific and technological developments relevant to the Convention". Most Review Conferences have adopted additional understandings or agreements that have interpreted or elaborated the meaning, scope, and implementation of BWC provisions. These additional understandings are contained in the final documents of the Review Conferences and in an overview document prepared by the BWC Implementation Support Unit for the Eighth Review Conference in 2016.

Intersessional program 
As agreed at the Fifth Review Conference in 2001/2002, annual BWC meetings have been held between Review Conferences starting in 2003, referred to as the intersessional program. The intersessional program includes both annual Meetings of States Parties (MSP)—aiming to discuss, and promote common understanding and effective action on the topics identified by the Review Conference—as well as Meetings of Experts (MX), which serve as preparation for the Meeting of States Parties. The annual meetings do not have the mandate to adopt decisions, a privilege reserved for the Review Conferences which consider the results from the intersessional program.

Challenges

Potential misuse of rapid scientific and technological developments 
Advances in science and technology are relevant to the BWC since they may affect the threat presented by biological weapons. The ongoing advances in synthetic biology and enabling technologies are eroding the technological barriers to acquiring and genetically enhancing dangerous pathogens and using them for hostile purposes. For example, a 2019 report by the Stockholm International Peace Research Institute finds that "advances in three specific emerging technologies—additive manufacturing (AM), artificial intelligence (AI) and robotics—could facilitate, each in their own way, the development or production of biological weapons and their delivery systems". Similarly, biological weapons expert Filippa Lentzos argues that the convergence of genomic technologies with "machine learning, automation, affective computing, and robotics (...) [will] create the possibility of novel biological weapons that target particular groups of people and even individuals". On the other hand, these scientific developments may improve pandemic preparedness by strengthening prevention and response measures.

Technological challenges in the verification of biological weapons 
There are several reasons why biological weapons are especially difficult to verify. First, in contrast to chemical and nuclear weapons, even small initial quantities of biological agents can be used to quickly produce militarily significant amounts. Second, biotechnological equipment and even dangerous pathogens and toxins cannot be prohibited altogether since they also have legitimate peaceful or defensive purposes, including the development of vaccines and medical therapies. Third, it is possible to rapidly eliminate biological agents, which makes short-notice inspections less effective in determining whether a facility produces biological weapons. For these reasons, Filippa Lentzos notes that "it is not possible to verify the BWC with the same level of accuracy and reliability as the verification of nuclear treaties".

Financial health of the Convention 
BWC intersessional program meetings have recently been impeded by late payments and non-payments of financial contributions. BWC States Parties agreed at the Meeting of States Parties in 2018, which was cut short due to funding shortfalls, on a package of remedial financial measures including the establishment of a Working Capital Fund. This fund is financed by voluntary contributions and provides short-term financing in order to ensure the continuity of approved programs and activities. Live information on the financial status of the BWC and other disarmament conventions is available publicly on the financial dashboard of the United Nations Office for Disarmament Affairs.

See also

Biological weapons and warfare 

 Australia Group of countries controlling exports to prevent the spread of biological and chemical weapons
 Biological weapons
 Biological warfare
 Biological terrorism
 Geneva Protocol, the first treaty to prohibit the use of biological and chemical weapons
 International pandemic treaty
 United Nations Security Council Resolution 1540, resolution to curb the proliferation of weapons of mass destruction, particularly to non-state actors

Treaties for other types of weapons of mass destruction 

 Chemical Weapons Convention (CWC) (states parties)
 Nuclear Non-Proliferation Treaty (NPT) (states parties)
 Treaty on the Prohibition of Nuclear Weapons (TPNW) (states parties)
 Comprehensive Nuclear Test-Ban Treaty (CTBT) (states parties)

References

External links 

 Official resources created by the United Nations Office for Disarmament Affairs
 Official website of the Biological Weapons Convention
 Full text of the Biological Weapons Convention, Treaty Database
 Brochure: The Biological Weapons Convention: An Introduction
 Meetings Place. A page with details on disarmament meetings, including documents and presentations.
 BWC Meeting of States Parties
 BWC Meetings of Experts
 Electronic Confidence-Building Measures facility
 Article X cooperation and assistance database
 External resources
 "Treaties and Regimes: The Biological Weapons Convention", Nuclear Threat Initiative
 "The Biological Weapons Convention (BWC) at a Glance", Arms Control Association
 "The Historical Context of the Origins of the Biological Weapons Convention (BWC)", University College London
 "Understanding Biological Disarmament: Final Report"

Arms control treaties
Biological warfare
Cold War treaties
Human rights instruments
Non-proliferation treaties
Treaties of the Soviet Union
Treaties concluded in 1972
Treaties entered into force in 1975
1975 in politics
Treaties of the Republic of Afghanistan
Treaties of Albania
Treaties of Algeria
Treaties of Andorra
Treaties of Angola
Treaties of Antigua and Barbuda
Treaties of Argentina
Treaties of Armenia
Treaties of Australia
Treaties of Austria
Treaties of Azerbaijan
Treaties of the Bahamas
Treaties of Bahrain
Treaties of Bangladesh
Treaties of Barbados
Treaties of the Byelorussian Soviet Socialist Republic
Treaties of Belgium
Treaties of Belize
Treaties of the Republic of Dahomey
Treaties of Bhutan
Treaties of Bolivia
Treaties of Bosnia and Herzegovina
Treaties of Botswana
Treaties of the military dictatorship in Brazil
Treaties of Brunei
Treaties of the People's Republic of Bulgaria
Treaties of Burkina Faso
Treaties of Myanmar
Treaties of Burundi
Treaties of the People's Republic of Kampuchea
Treaties of Cameroon
Treaties of Canada
Treaties of Cape Verde
Treaties of Chile
Treaties of the People's Republic of China
Treaties of Taiwan
Treaties of Colombia
Treaties of the Republic of the Congo
Treaties of Zaire
Treaties of the Cook Islands
Treaties of Costa Rica
Treaties of Croatia
Treaties of Cuba
Treaties of Cyprus
Treaties of Czechoslovakia
Treaties of the Czech Republic
Treaties of Denmark
Treaties of Dominica
Treaties of the Dominican Republic
Treaties of Ecuador
Treaties of El Salvador
Treaties of Equatorial Guinea
Treaties of Estonia
Treaties of the Derg
Treaties of Fiji
Treaties of Finland
Treaties of France
Treaties of Gabon
Treaties of the Gambia
Treaties of Georgia (country)
Treaties of West Germany
Treaties of East Germany
Treaties of Ghana
Treaties of Greece
Treaties of Grenada
Treaties of Guatemala
Treaties of Guinea-Bissau
Treaties of Guyana
Treaties of the Holy See
Treaties of Honduras
Treaties of the Hungarian People's Republic
Treaties of Iceland
Treaties of India
Treaties of Indonesia
Treaties of Pahlavi Iran
Treaties of Ba'athist Iraq
Treaties of Ireland
Treaties of Italy
Treaties of Ivory Coast
Treaties of Jamaica
Treaties of Japan
Treaties of Jordan
Treaties of Kazakhstan
Treaties of Kenya
Treaties of Kuwait
Treaties of Kyrgyzstan
Treaties of Laos
Treaties of Latvia
Treaties of Lebanon
Treaties of Lesotho
Treaties of Liberia
Treaties of the Libyan Arab Jamahiriya
Treaties of Liechtenstein
Treaties of Lithuania
Treaties of Luxembourg
Treaties of North Macedonia
Treaties of Madagascar
Treaties of Malawi
Treaties of Malaysia
Treaties of the Maldives
Treaties of Mali
Treaties of Malta
Treaties of the Marshall Islands
Treaties of Mauritania
Treaties of Mauritius
Treaties of Mexico
Treaties of Moldova
Treaties of Monaco
Treaties of the Mongolian People's Republic
Treaties of Montenegro
Treaties of Morocco
Treaties of Mozambique
Treaties of Nauru
Treaties of Nepal
Treaties of the Netherlands
Treaties of New Zealand
Treaties of Nicaragua
Treaties of Nigeria
Treaties of Niger
Treaties of North Korea
Treaties of Norway
Treaties of Oman
Treaties of Pakistan
Treaties of Palau
Treaties of Panama
Treaties of Papua New Guinea
Treaties of Paraguay
Treaties of Peru
Treaties of the Philippines
Treaties of the Polish People's Republic
Treaties of Portugal
Treaties of Qatar
Treaties of the Socialist Republic of Romania
Treaties of Rwanda
Treaties of Saint Kitts and Nevis
Treaties of Saint Lucia
Treaties of Saint Vincent and the Grenadines
Treaties of San Marino
Treaties of São Tomé and Príncipe
Treaties of Saudi Arabia
Treaties of Senegal
Treaties of Yugoslavia
Treaties of Seychelles
Treaties of Sierra Leone
Treaties of Singapore
Treaties of Slovakia
Treaties of Slovenia
Treaties of the Solomon Islands
Treaties of South Africa
Treaties of South Korea
Treaties of Spain
Treaties of Sri Lanka
Treaties of the Republic of the Sudan (1985–2011)
Treaties of Suriname
Treaties of Eswatini
Treaties of Sweden
Treaties of Switzerland
Treaties of Tajikistan
Treaties of Thailand
Treaties of East Timor
Treaties of Togo
Treaties of Tonga
Treaties of Trinidad and Tobago
Treaties of Tunisia
Treaties of Turkey
Treaties of Turkmenistan
Treaties of Uganda
Treaties of the Ukrainian Soviet Socialist Republic
Treaties of the United Arab Emirates
Treaties of the United Kingdom
Treaties of the United States
Treaties of Uruguay
Treaties of Uzbekistan
Treaties of Vanuatu
Treaties of Venezuela
Treaties of Vietnam
Treaties of the Yemen Arab Republic
Treaties of South Yemen
Treaties of Zambia
Treaties of Zimbabwe
Treaties extended to Greenland
Treaties extended to the Faroe Islands
Treaties extended to the Netherlands Antilles
Treaties extended to Aruba
Treaties extended to Saint Christopher-Nevis-Anguilla
Treaties extended to Bermuda
Treaties extended to the British Virgin Islands
Treaties extended to the Cayman Islands
Treaties extended to the Falkland Islands
Treaties extended to Gibraltar
Treaties extended to Montserrat
Treaties extended to the Pitcairn Islands
Treaties extended to Saint Helena, Ascension and Tristan da Cunha
Treaties extended to South Georgia and the South Sandwich Islands
Treaties extended to the Turks and Caicos Islands